Aron Leonard Dønnum (born 20 April 1998) is a Norwegian professional footballer who plays as a winger for  Standard Liège.

Club career
Dønnum made his debut for Vålerenga on 17 July 2017 against Kristiansund, in a game that ended 1–1.

He joined Belgian First Division A club Standard Liège in July 2021, having agreed a four-year contract with the club.

On 30 March 2022, Dønnum returned to Vålerenga on loan until 30 June 2022.

International career
Dønnum made his debut for the Norway national team on 2 June 2021 in a friendly against Luxembourg, substituting for Jens Petter Hauge in the 64th minute.

Career statistics

References

https://www.facebook.com/aron.donnum.official

1998 births
Living people
People from Eidsvoll
Norwegian footballers
Norway under-21 international footballers
Norway international footballers
Association football forwards
Eliteserien players
Norwegian First Division players
Belgian Pro League players
Vålerenga Fotball players
Hamarkameratene players
Standard Liège players
Norwegian expatriate footballers
Norwegian expatriate sportspeople in Belgium
Expatriate footballers in Belgium
Sportspeople from Viken (county)